Mohammed Hassan El-Zayyat (14 February 1915 – 25 February 1993) was an Egyptian diplomat and Minister of Foreign Affairs. 

El-Zayyat served as the Permanent Representative of Egypt in the United Nations from 1960 to 1964 and again from 1969 to 1972. In 1964-1965 he served as Egyptian Ambassador to India. In 1972 he briefly served as Minister of Information. He served as the Minister of Foreign Affairs from 8 September 1972 to 31 October 1973.

External links
 List of Egyptian Ministers of Foreign Affairs
 New York Times obituary
 Archived New York Times article

1915 births
1993 deaths
Egyptian diplomats
Information ministers of Egypt
Foreign ministers of Egypt
Permanent Representatives of Egypt to the United Nations
Ambassadors of Egypt to Ghana